Hazel Keech (born 28 February 1987), also known by her modelling name Rose Dawn and married name Gurbasant Kaur, is a British actress and model who has appeared in Indian films and television. She has appeared in Billa and Bodyguard as well as in a Suzuki advertisement. She danced in the Frankfinn Music remix item number "Kahin Pe Nigahaen". She appeared in the reality television programme Bigg Boss 7 in 2013.

Early life
Keech was born on 28 February 1987 in Essex, England, to a British Hindu father and an Indo-Mauritian Hindu mother of Bihari ancestry. She did her schooling at Beal High School in Redbridge, London, where she performed in stage shows and learned various forms of dance including Indian classical, British dance and western contemporary.

Career

Keech became involved in television, film and stage. She danced in the British programme Agatha Christie's Marple. The BBC documentary show Call The Shots showed her working in Hindi films. She joined the team of the Bollywood musical Bombay Dreams for their London promotional tour in 2002 and sang in the choir of the West End musical Joseph and the Amazing Technicolor Dreamcoat the following year. She was an extra in several of the Harry Potter films.

In 2005, while holidaying in Mumbai, she received work offers and decided to stay and pursue a modelling and acting career in India. The first modelling company she worked with changed her name to Rose Dawn. She then worked in various music videos as "Kahin Pe Nigahen" as well as many TV commercials, such as Vivel by ITC, and the Sprite 'University of Freshology' commercial. In 2007, Keech appeared in the 2007 Tamil film Billa, where she performed an item number in the song "Sei Ethavathu". In 2011, she played a supporting role in the Hindi film Bodyguard produced by Atul Agnihotri and directed by Siddique. She also performed an item number titled "Aa Ante Amlapuram" in the film Maximum. She performed a song, "Chal Chal Chal", in the film Krishnam Vande Jagadgurum (2012).

Bigg Boss 7
She appeared in the popular Indian TV show Bigg Boss 7 in September 2013 but a week later she was eliminated, the first contestant to exit the house. In an interview after her eviction she expressed her anger about Pratyusha Banerjee, saying, "She likes to create problems".

Filmography

Television

Personal life
On 12 November 2015, Keech got engaged to Indian cricketer Yuvraj Singh. They were married on 30 November 2016. After marriage, Hazel adopted the name "Gurbasant Kaur", which was given to her by Sant Balvinder Singh during the wedding ceremony. The couple had their first child, a boy on 25 January 2022.

Keech admitted in an interview that she survived severe depression and was suicidal in her time in India, and so she took up diploma to learn Psychotherapy to help others like her.

References

External links

 
 

1987 births
Living people
People from Essex
English film actresses
British film actresses
English people of Indian descent
Mauritian people of Indian descent
English people of Mauritian descent
British actresses of Indian descent
British emigrants to India
Actresses in Hindi cinema
Actresses in Tamil cinema
Actresses in Telugu cinema
Actresses in Punjabi cinema
British expatriate actresses in India
European actresses in India
Actresses of European descent in Indian films
Bigg Boss (Hindi TV series) contestants
21st-century English actresses